The One may refer to:

Buildings
 The One (shopping centre), a shopping centre in Tsim Sha Tsui, Kowloon, Hong Kong
 The One (Toronto), a mixed-use skyscraper under development in Toronto, Canada
 The One, a residential skyscraper under construction in Brisbane Quarter, Australia
 The One (Colombo), a project skyscraper under construction in Colombo, Sri Lanka
 "The One", marketed as the most expensive house in the modern world, sold at auction for $127 million, built by Nile Niami

Fictional characters 
 The One, character in the Animorphs book series
 The One Who Is The One, the principal antagonist in James Patterson's Witch and Wizard
 The One, character in Transformers
 "The One" an alternative name for Neo in The Matrix trilogy
 The One, character played by Bruce Payne in Billy the Kid and the Green Baize Vampire

Film and television
 The One (2001 film), an action film starring Jet Li
 The One (2003 film), a romantic comedy film starring Richard Ruccolo
 The One (2011 film), an American romantic comedy film directed by Caytha Jentis
 "The One" (Ghost Whisperer episode), episode
 The One (TV program), a 2008 Australian TV program about psychics
 The One: Making a Music Star, a July 2006 reality television program
 The One (video), a recording of Michael Jackson's 2004 CBS special
 The One, a designated contestant in 1 vs. 100
 The One (TV series), a 2021 series released by Netflix
 The One (2022 film), a Russian disaster-survival film directed by Dmitry Suvorov

Literature 
The One (magazine), a video game magazine from the United Kingdom
The One (comics), a comic book series by Rick Veitch
The One (manhua), a manhua by Nicky Lee
The One, concept in the Young Wizards book series

Music
 The One (singer), South Korean singer
 The One (band), a British band
 The One, fans of Babymetal
 The one or downbeat, a beat in music

Albums
 The One (Chubb Rock album) (1991)
 The One (Elton John album) (1992)
 The One Concert Live, by Jau Chou (2002)
 The One (Annihilator EP) (2004)
 The One (Frankie J album) (2004)
 The One (Jane Zhang album) (2006)
 The One (Shinichi Osawa album) (2007)
 The One (Silly Fools album) (2008)
 The One (Afgansyah Reza album) (2010)
 The One (Uverworld album) (2012)
 The One (Eric Benét album) (2012)
 The One (Chris Jasper album) (2014)
 The One (Sergey Lazarev album) (2018)
 The One (Kita Alexander EP) (2022)

Songs
 "The One" (Elton John song), 1992
 "The One" (Backstreet Boys song), 2000
 "The One" (Foo Fighters song), 2002
 "The One" (Gary Allan song), 2002
 "The One" (Shakira song), 2002
 "The One" (Kylie Minogue song), 2008
 "The One" (Mary J. Blige song), 2009
 "The One" (M.I.A. song), 2022
 "The One" (Slaughterhouse song), 2009
 "The One" (Medina song), 2011
 "The One" (Tamar Braxton song), 2013
 "The One" (Kodaline song), 2015
 "The One" (The Chainsmokers song), 2017
 "The One" (Aneta Sablik song), 2014
 "The One: Crash to Create", a 2012 song by Luna Sea
 "The 1", a 2020 song by Taylor Swift

 "The One", later retitled "Lighters (The One)", a 2013 song by Gabz
 "The One", by Tracy Bonham from the album The Burdens of Being Upright, 1996
 "The One", by White Zombie from the soundtrack album for Escape from L.A., 1996
 "The One", by New Power Generation from the album Newpower Soul, 1998
 "The One", by The Moody Blues from the album Strange Times, 1999
 "The One", by Limp Bizkit from the album Chocolate Starfish and the Hot Dog Flavored Water, 2000
 "The One", by Jennifer Lopez from the album This Is Me... Then, 2002
 "The One", by Mariah Carey from the album Charmbracelet, 2002
 "The One", by The Prom Kings from the  album The Prom Kings, 2005
 "The One", by Reks from the album Grey Hairs, 2008
 "The One", by Sharam from the album Get Wild, 2009
 "The One", by Planningtorock from the album W, 2011
 "The One", by Terri Clark from the album Roots and Wings, 2011
 "The One", by Deuce from the album Nine Lives, 2012
 "The One", by Garbage from the album Not Your Kind of People, 2012
 "The One", by GOOD Music from the album Cruel Summer, 2014
 "The One", by Babymetal from the album Metal Resistance, 2016
 "The One", by Carly Rae Jepsen from the EP Emotion: Side B, 2016
 "The One", by Exo-CBX from the EP Hey Mama!, 2016
 "The One", by Betty Who from the album Betty, 2019
 "The One", by MacKenzie Porter from the EP Drinkin' Songs: The Collection, 2020
 "The One", by Rita Ora from the EP Bang, 2021
 "The One", a 2015 song by W&W
 "The 1", by Janet Jackson from the album Discipline, 2008
 “The One”, a song by Mark Owen from “The Art of Doing Nothing”, 2013
 “The One”, a song by Ronan Keating from “Twenty Twenty”, 2020

Other uses
The One (Neoplatonism)
The One (company), a United Arab Emirates-based furniture company

See also
 Absolute (philosophy)
 The Chosen One (disambiguation)
 The Great One (disambiguation)
 Henology
 Henosis
 Monad (philosophy)
 Monotheism
 One (disambiguation)
 The One and Only (disambiguation)
 The One That Got Away (disambiguation)
 Soulmate
 La Une, a Belgian TV channel